Frederick Leonard Beebe (December 31, 1879 – October 30, 1957) was a professional baseball player. He played for the Chicago Cubs, St. Louis Cardinals, Cincinnati Reds, Philadelphia Phillies and Cleveland Indians.

Biography
Beebe played baseball for the Hyde Park High School in Chicago and the University of Illinois.

Beebe made his professional debut on April 17, 1906, and played Major League Baseball from 1906 to 1916. In his rookie year, Beebe led the Major Leagues with 171 strikeouts. His career record was 62–83.

After leaving the league, he served as the head coach of the Indiana Hoosiers college baseball team.

See also
 List of Major League Baseball annual strikeout leaders
 List of St. Louis Cardinals team records

References

External links 
 Early High School Baseball in Illinois

 Baseball Almanac
 SportsPool.com
 2011 Indiana baseball history & records 

1879 births
1957 deaths
Major League Baseball pitchers
Baseball players from Nebraska
Sportspeople from Lincoln, Nebraska
St. Louis Cardinals players
Chicago Cubs players
Cincinnati Reds players
Philadelphia Phillies players
Cleveland Indians players
Indiana Hoosiers baseball coaches
National League strikeout champions
Illinois Fighting Illini baseball players
Buffalo Bisons (minor league) players
Louisville Colonels (minor league) players
Wichita Witches players
Hyde Park Academy High School alumni